Marina Petrovna Saenko ([]; born May 1, 1975) is a former Russian football defender well known for playing for Energiya Voronezh in the Russian Championship

She has been a member of the Russian national team. She was named the MVP of Russia's 3-0 win over Ghana in the 2003 World Cup, where she scored one goal.

References

1975 births
Living people
Russian women's footballers
Russia women's international footballers
2003 FIFA Women's World Cup players
FC Energy Voronezh players
People from Ruzayevka
Sportspeople from Mordovia
Women's association football defenders